William McRae (18 June 1904 – 25 July 1973) was an Australian cricketer. He played four first-class matches for Western Australia between 1927/28 and 1928/29.

See also
 List of Western Australia first-class cricketers

References

External links
 

1904 births
1973 deaths
Australian cricketers
Western Australia cricketers